Brian W. Matthews is a biochemist and biophysicist educated at the University of Adelaide, contributor to x-ray crystallographic methodology at the University of Cambridge, and since 1970  at the University of Oregon as Professor of Physics and HHMI investigator in the Institute of Molecular Biology.

He created hundreds of mutants of T4 lysozyme (making it the commonest structure in the PDB), determined their structure by x-ray crystallography and measured their melting temperatures. Starting from questions about the basis of "temperature-sensitive" mutations, his work has explicated much about the general energetic and structural effects of mutations in proteins. He also solved early structures of the thermophilic bacterial enzyme thermolysin, the helix-turn-helix DNA-binding transcription factor lambda Cro repressor, and the light-antenna bacteriochlorophyll protein.

Beyond his contributions to biochemistry, Matthews is also known in the machine learning community for the Matthews correlation coefficient, which he introduced in a paper in 1975. The coefficient is used as a measure of the quality of binary (two-class) classifications.

Matthews has been a member of the National Academy of Sciences since 1986. He is the editor of the scientific journal Protein Science.

References

External links
Brian Matthews at The Institute of Molecular Biology at the University of Oregon
HHMI Alumni Scientists
Molecule of the Month: Lysozyme

1938 births
Living people
University of Adelaide alumni
Australian biochemists
Australian biophysicists
Members of the United States National Academy of Sciences
University of Oregon faculty
Howard Hughes Medical Investigators